Sun Yumin (born 1940), born Yang Yuemin, is a Chinese Peking opera artist who specializes in dan (female) roles. She is a disciple of Xun Huisheng. Born in Shanghai, Sun Yumin first rose to stardom in Beijing in the early 1960s.

Like most traditional artists, Sun Yumin was persecuted during the Cultural Revolution (1966–1976). Accused of treason, she was locked away in a rural May Seventh Cadre School in Henan, where she suffered daily abuse, including beatings. In 1968, she jumped down from her third floor window to kill herself. She bounced on a tree branch which helped save her life, but broke over 20 bones in her legs and backbone. She was incontinent and couldn't walk for over a year and spent over 5 years in the hospital. Her mother did kill herself in 1970.

After the Cultural Revolution, she was determined to return to stage — which she did in 1979 — and carry on the legacy of Xun Huisheng (who was persecuted to death in 1968). Although she has an obvious limp, she trained hard to make it imperceptible during her performances. Sun Yumin has also taken on over 60 students, written a number of books, including an autobiography and a biography of Xun Huisheng — the latter of which was adapted, supervised by her, into a 28-episode TV series directed by Xia Gang. She also served as the president of Beijing Xiqu Vocational Institute of Arts.

References

1940 births
Living people
Chinese Peking opera actresses
Singers from Shanghai
Actresses from Shanghai
Chinese film actresses
Victims of the Cultural Revolution
20th-century Chinese actresses
20th-century Chinese women singers